Preseľany is a municipality in the Topoľčany District of the Nitra Region, Slovakia. In Preseľany is football club, skittles club and bodybuilding club.

References

External links
http://en.e-obce.sk/obec/preselany/preselany.html
Official homepage

Villages and municipalities in Topoľčany District